Emma Gao is a Chinese oenologist, who is the chief winemaker at Silver Heights winery, one of China's most prestigious vineyards.

Biography 
Born in China, Gao moved to France in 1999, aged 21, to study oenology at the University of Bordeaux, where she was awarded a Diplome National d’Oenologue. She subsequently worked at Château Calon-Ségur, where she met her future husband, Thierry Courtade. She returned to China in 2004, first working at a winery in Xinjiang, then working in wine sales in Shanghai. In 2007 she and her father founded Silver Heights winery on land he was already cultivating in Ningxia.

By 2018 Silver Heights had become known as a "leading boutique winery". Gao's first vintage as chief winemaker was praised by Chinese and international winemakers, and two of her red wines are among the best known produced in China. They are a Cabernet Sauvignon ‘Emma’s Reserve’ and a Bordeaux blend ‘The Summit’. Dubbed a 'micro-vineyard' Silver Heights produces 40,000 bottles of wine each year. In 2017 Gao began to convert their winemaking processes to purely biodynamic ones. In 2020 the company made its first exports to the UK, US, Singapore, Belgium, Demark and Italy. Pioneer of Chinese wine, Gérard Colin, stated that Gao is "considered the best winemaker, with practically the best wine, in all of China".

Gao has spoken out about how the climate crisis is affecting wine production, in particular causing damage to the vines due increasingly harsh winters.

References

External links 

 Meet the Winemaker - Emma Gao - Silver Heights Winery, China
 Uncorked: Emma Gao of Silver Heights

Living people
Oenologists
Chinese wine
Winemakers
People from Ningxia
University of Bordeaux alumni
1978 births